The Soap Box Derby is a youth soapbox car racing program which has been run in the United States since 1933. World Championship finals are held each July at Derby Downs in Akron, Ohio. Cars competing in this and related events are unpowered, relying completely upon gravity to move.

History
In the wake of the first car races, local youth auto races took place in the US at a very early stage. In 1914 the motion picture  Kid Auto Races at Venice starring Charlie Chaplin was shown in the cinemas.

In 1933 Myron Scott, a photographer for Dayton, Ohio, newspaper Dayton Daily News, saw Robert A. Gravett and friends racing down a hill in Dayton Ohio and put together an impromptu race for 19 boys. There was so much interest that Scott arranged a bigger race, with prize money for August 19. "An amazing crowd of 362 kids showed up with homemade cars built of orange crates, sheet tin, wagon and baby-buggy wheels...."

The following year, the first All-American race was held on August 19, 1934.  The national winner was Robert Turner of Muncie, Indiana, who made his car from the wood of a saloon bar.

In 1935, the race was moved from Dayton to Akron because of its central location and hilly terrain. An accident in 1935 captured the public's interest, and boosted the event's profile.  A car went off the track and struck NBC's top commentator and sportscaster Graham McNamee while he was broadcasting live on the air.  Despite a concussion and other injuries (which resulted in a two-week hospital stay), McNamee described the collision to his listeners and finished his broadcast.

In 1936, Akron civic leaders recognized the need for a permanent track site for the youth racing classic, and through the efforts of the Works Progress Administration (WPA), Derby Downs became a reality.

In 1946, the town of Mission, British Columbia, acquired the rights to the Western Canada Soapbox Derby Championships and the Mission Regional Chamber of Commerce, previously named the Mission City & District Board of Trade, organized the event annually until 1973.

During the All American Soapbox Derby's heyday in the 1950s and 1960s–when Chevrolet was a sponsor and famous TV and movie stars made guest appearances–as many as 70,000 people gathered in August to eat snow cones and cheer hundreds of youthful racer/builders (boys only in early years) ages 11–15 who were the champions of local races around the nation and from several foreign countries.

In 1947, actor James Stewart was appearing in the Broadway play Harvey. In order to attend the event, he cancelled a weekend's worth of performances and refunds were issued to ticketholders.

At its peak, the Derby was one of the top five sporting events in terms of attendance. John DeLorean ended the 35-year Chevrolet sponsorship in 1972, claiming that the Derby was outdated and too expensive to hold.

Starting in 1993, the All-American Soap Box derby began the Rally World Championship. The Rally derby is a grand prix style of race in which each district, ten in all, sends back a number of champions based on number of racers and races in each district.

Today there are broader categories that extend the age range to younger racers and permit adults to assist in construction. This is especially helpful for younger children who cannot use power tools, as well as to provide an outlet for adults.

The All-American Soap Box Derby Championship was cancelled in 2020 due to the COVID-19 pandemic. During its 75-year history, the derby had also been cancelled during the World War II years of 1942, 1943, 1944, and 1945. The race returned in 2021.

In 2021, Johnny Buehler, from Warrensburg, Missouri, became the youngest racer in the 83-year history to win the All-American Soap Box Derby Local Stock Division. He was eight years old at the time of his win.

Modern soapbox racing

Using standardized wheels with precision ball bearings, modern gravity-powered racers start at a ramp on top of a hill, attaining speeds of up to 35 miles per hour.  Rally races and qualifying races in cities around the world use advanced timing systems that measure the time difference between the competing cars to the thousandth of a second to determine the winner of a heat. Each heat of a race lasts less than 30 seconds. Most races are double elimination races in which a racer that loses a heat can work their way through the Challenger's Bracket in an attempt to win the overall race. The annual World Championship race in Akron, however, is a single elimination race which uses overhead photography, triggered by a timing system, to determine the winner of each heat. Approximately 500 racers compete in two or three heats to determine a World Champion in each divisions.

There are three racing divisions in most locals and at the All-American competition. The Stock division is designed to give the first-time builder a learning experience. Boys and girls, ages 7 through 13, compete in simplified cars built from kits purchased from the All-American. These kits assist the Derby novice by providing a step-by-step layout for construction of a basic lean forward style car. The Super Stock Car division, ages 9 through 18, gives the competitor an opportunity to expand their knowledge and build a more advanced model. Both of these beginner levels make use of kits and shells available from the All-American. These entry levels of racing are popular in race communities across the country, as youngsters are exposed to the Derby program for the first time. The Masters division offers boys and girls, ages 10 through 20, an advanced class of racer in which to try their creativity and design skills. Masters entrants may purchase a Scottie Masters Kit with a fiberglass body from the All-American Soap Box Derby.

Ultimate Speed Challenge

The Ultimate Speed Challenge  is an All American Soap Box Derby sanctioned racing format that was developed in 2004 to preserve the tradition of innovation, creativity, and craftsmanship in the design of a gravity powered racing vehicle while generating intrigue, excitement, and engaging the audience at the annual All-American Soap Box Derby competition.  The goal of the event is to attract creative entries designed to reach speeds never before attainable on the historic Akron hill. The competition consists of three timed runs (one run in each lane), down Akron's  hill. The car and team that achieve the fastest single run is declared the winner. The timed runs are completed during the All American Soap Box Derby race week.

The open rules of the Ultimate speed Challenge have led to a variety of interesting car designs.,  Winning times have improved as wheel technology has advanced and the integration between the cars and wheels has improved via the use of wheel fairings.  Wheels play a key role in a car's success in the race. Wheel optimization has included a trend towards a smaller diameter (to reduce inertial effects and aerodynamic drag), the use of custom rubber or urethane tires (to reduce rolling resistance), and the use of solvents to swell the tires (also reducing rolling resistance).   There is some overlap in technology between this race and other gravity racing events, including the buggy races race at Carnegie Mellon University.

In 2004, during the inaugural run of the Ultimate Speed Challenge, the fastest time was achieved by a car designed and built by the Pearson family, driven by Alicia Kimball, and utilizing high performance pneumatic tires. The winning time achieved on the  track was 27.190 seconds.

Jerry Pearson returned to defend the title with driver Nicki Henry in the 2005 Ultimate Speed Challenge beating the 2004 record time and breaking the 27.00 second barrier with an elapsed time of 26.953 seconds. Second place went to the DC Derbaticians with a time of 27.085 while third went to Talon Racing of Florida with a time of 27.320.

John Wargo, from California, put together the 2006 Ultimate Speed Challenge winning team with driver Jenny Rodway.  Jenny set a new track record of 26.934 seconds.  Jenny's record stood for 3 years as  revisions to the track and ramps after the 2006 race caused winning times to rise in subsequent races.  Team Pearson finished 2nd with a time of 26.999 seconds and team Thomas finished 3rd with a time of 27.065.

Team Eliminator, composed of crew chief and designer Jack Barr and driver Lynnel McClellan, achieved victory with a time of 27.160 in the 70th (2007) All-American Soap Box Derby Ultimate Speed Challenge. Jenn Rodway finished 2nd with a time of 27.334 while Hilary Pearson finished 3rd with a time of 27.367.

Jack Barr returned in 2008 with driver Krista Osborne for a repeat team win with a 27.009 second run.  Crew chief Tom Schurr and driver Cory Schurr place second with a time of 27.023 while crew chief Mike Albertoni and driver Danielle Hughes were 3rd after posting a time of 27.072.

In the 72nd (2009) AASBD Ultimate Speed Challenge, Derek Fitzgerald's Zero-Error Racing team, with driver Jamie Berndt, took advantage of a freshly paved track,  and set a new record time of 26.924 seconds.  Cory Schurr placed second with a time of 26.987.  Laura Overmyer of clean sheet racing finished third with a time of 27.003.

In 2010, Mark Overmyer's Clean Sheet/Sigma Nu team (CSSN) and driver Jim Overmyer set the track record at 26.861 seconds in the first heat of the opening round. Several minutes later, driver Sheri Lazowski, also of CSSN, lowered the record to 26.844 seconds, resulting in victory by 0.005 seconds over 2nd-place finisher Jamie Berndt of Zero Error. Competition was tight in 2010, with the top 3 cars finishing within a span of 0.017 seconds.

In 2011, advancements in wheel technology and car design, coupled with ideal track conditions, lead to significantly lower times in the Ultimate Speed Challenge.  Driver Kayla Albertoni and crew chief Mike Albertoni broke the record in heat 2 or the opening round with a 26.765, taking 0.079 seconds off the 2010 record.     One heat later, driver Jim Overmyer and crew chief Mark Estes of team CSSN racing lowered the record a further 0.133 with a 26.632 run.  Jim improved to 26.613 in round 2 to secure 2nd place.  In heat 5, of the opening round, driver Kristi Murphy and crew chief Pat Murphy secured 3rd place with a run of 26.677.   In the next heat,  driver Sheri Lazowski and crew chief Mark Overmyer (of CSSN racing) took the victory with a blistering run of 26.585 seconds.  Sheri's record time was 0.259 seconds under her 2010 record and 0.339 seconds below the 2009 record.  Her improvement in 2011 is the largest year-to-year change in the record in the history of the AAUSC race.  By winning in both 2010 and 2011, Sheri became the first repeat USC winner.

In 2012, revised starting ramps and a re-sealed track with a softer road surface, led to significant increases in finishing times.  The 2012 winner, Laura Overmyer of CSSN racing, with crew chief Mark Estes, posted a winning time of 26.655 seconds, 0.070 seconds slower than the track record set by her team the prior year.  Kristi Murphy, of Zero Error racing, finished in 2nd with a time of 26.769, 0.114 seconds back. Jamie Berndt, also of Zero Error racing, finished in 3rd place with a time of 26.827.  Competition was not as close as in recent years, with the top 3 cars covering a span of 0.172 seconds.  This is roughly double the span in 2009 and 2011 and 10 times the span in 2010.  The 2012 results mark the 3rd consecutive win by CSSN racing and the 4th consecutive win by wheel expert Duane Delaney.

The 2013 race was run under wet conditions which necessitated a format change. Each car was given a single run from lane 2 to determine the winner.  The running  order was randomly determined.   CSSN Racing's Anne Taylor with crew chief Jerry Pearson won with a time of 26.929.  Jillian Brinberg and crew chief Mark Estes, also of CSSN Racing,  finished 2nd with a time of 26.978.  Catherine Carney with crew chief Lee Carney finished 3rd with a time of 27.162.

In 2014, CSSN's Anne Taylor with crew chief Jerry Pearson won with a time of 26.613. Anne's time improves on the prior best time for the new gate configuration but falls short of the 2011 record.  This marks Anne's 2nd consecutive win and the 5th consecutive win for CSSN racing in this event. CSSN's Tucker McClaran with crew chief Mark Estes finished second with a time of 26.667. Catherine Carney with crew chief Lee Carney finished 3rd with a time of 26.750.

1973 scandal

In 1973, 14-year-old Jimmy Gronen of Boulder, Colorado was stripped of his title two days after winning the national race.  Suspicions were running high even before the finals, and Gronen was actually booed by many spectators.

The unusual dimensions of Gronen's margins of victory and heat times tipped off derby officials to illegal circumstances surrounding Gronen's racer. Subsequent X-ray examination of his car revealed an electromagnet in the nose. When activated at the starting line, the electromagnet pulled the car forward by attracting it to the steel paddle used to start the race. Gronen activated the electromagnet by leaning his helmet against the backrest of his seat, which activated its battery power source. This became very evident as Gronen's heat times progressively slowed down as the race wore on, because the battery lost power each time the circuit was activated reducing the attraction of the electromagnet. Usually, heat times get faster each time a racer completes a heat. Videotape of the race also showed a suspiciously sudden lead for Gronen just a few feet after each heat began. Gronen's early heat victories were in the  range. (Aluminum insulator plates were added to the starting ramps in 1974 to render an electromagnetic system useless.) 

Midway through the 1973 race, Derby officials also replaced Gronen's wheels after chemicals were found to be applied to the wheels' rubber. The chemicals caused the tire rubber to swell, which reduced the rolling resistance of the tire.

In the final heat, Gronen finished narrowly ahead of Bret Yarborough.  Within two days, Yarborough was declared the 1973 champion.

Gronen's uncle and legal guardian at the time, wealthy engineer Robert Lange, was indicted for contributing to the delinquency of a minor and paid a $2,000 settlement.

Lange's son and Jimmy Gronen's cousin Bob Lange Jr., had won the previous 1972 Derby using a car considered indistinguishable from the vehicle used by Gronen.

References

Literature
Payne, Melanie: Champions, cheaters, and childhood dreams : memories of the soap box derby, Akron, Ohio : University of Akron Press, 2003  Library of Congress

Further reading
"Soap Box Racers Test Skill Of Boy Engineers" Popular Mechanics, July 1935 photos and drawing of original official rules and specification of racers
"How To Win the Soap Box Derby" Popular Mechanics, April 1936, pp.540-543 articles by VP of General Motors and by engineer for B.F. Goodrich

External links

Retrospective: New Jersey Soap Box Derby History

Racing
Recurring events established in 1934
1934 establishments in Ohio